In musical theory, 34 equal temperament, also referred to as 34-TET, 34-EDO or 34-ET, is the tempered tuning derived by dividing the octave into 34 equal-sized steps (equal frequency ratios).

History and use

Unlike divisions of the octave into 19, 31 or 53 steps, which can be considered as being derived from ancient Greek intervals (the greater and lesser diesis and the syntonic comma), division into 34 steps did not arise 'naturally' out of older music theory, although Cyriakus Schneegass proposed a meantone system with 34 divisions based in effect on half a chromatic semitone (the difference between a major third and a minor third, 25:24 or 70.67 cents). Wider interest in the tuning was not seen until modern times, when the computer made possible a systematic search of all possible equal temperaments. While Barbour discusses it, the first recognition of its potential importance appears to be in an article published in 1979 by the Dutch theorist Dirk de Klerk. The luthier Larry Hanson had an electric guitar refretted from 12 to 34 and persuaded American guitarist Neil Haverstick to take it up.

As compared with 31-et, 34-et reduces the combined mistuning from the theoretically ideal just thirds, fifths and sixths from 11.9 to 7.9 cents. Its fifths and sixths are markedly better, and its thirds only slightly further from the theoretical ideal of the 5:4 ratio. Viewed in light of Western diatonic theory, the three extra steps (of 34-et compared to 31-et) in effect widen the intervals between C and D, F and G, and A and B, thus making a distinction between major tones, ratio 9:8 and minor tones, ratio 10:9. This can be regarded either as a resource or as a problem, making modulation in the contemporary Western sense more complex. As the number of divisions of the octave is even, the exact halving of the octave (600 cents) appears, as in 12-et. Unlike 31-et, 34 does not give an approximation to the harmonic seventh, ratio 7:4.

Interval size

The following table outlines some of the intervals of this tuning system and their match to various ratios in the harmonic series.

Scale diagram

The following are 15 of the 34 notes in the scale:

The remaining notes can easily be added.

References
J. Murray Barbour, Tuning and Temperament, Michigan State College Press, 1951.

External links

 Dirk de Klerk. "Equal Temperament", Acta Musicologica, Vol. 51, Fasc. 1 (Jan. - Jun., 1979), pp. 140-150.
 Stickman: Neil Haverstick - Neil Haverstick is a composer and guitarist who uses microtonal tunings, especially 19, 31 and 34 tone equal temperament.

Equal temperaments
Microtonality